San Giovanni d’Asso is a frazione of the comune of Montalcino, province of Siena, Italy.

It was a comune until 2017.  The hamlet is overlooked by large Castle, now home to a large White truffle museum, and there is a festival celebrating the rare and fragrant tuber each year. The historical centre also houses the churches of San Giovanni Battista  (pieve) and  San Pietro in Villore, both of medieval origin.

Cities and towns in Tuscany
Crete Senesi
Castles in Italy
Frazioni of Montalcino